HMS M29 was a Royal Navy  monitor of the First World War. The ship was constructed by Harland & Wolff, in Belfast and launched on 22 May 1915, she was completed in June 1915. During World War I, the monitor served in the Mediterranean Sea at the Battle of Jaffa in 1917 and took part in operations in support of British and White Russian forces in the White Sea during the Russian Civil War in 1919. The ship was then converted to a minelayer and renamed HMS Medusa in 1925. In 1941 Medusa was converted to a repair and depot ship and was renamed HMS Talbot, then renamed HMS Medway II in 1944. In 1946, the vessel was sold for scrap.

However, the ship was given a reprieve and acquired by a Greek shipowner who rebuilt the vessel as a cargo ship in 1950–1951. The ship, renamed Gerogeorgakis was used for smuggling and was seized off Cavallo Island in 1971. The ship was then sold at auction and broken up for scrap in 1974.

Construction and career
The availability of ten 6-inch Mk XII guns from the s in 1915 prompted the Admiralty to order five scaled down versions of the s, which had been designed to utilise 9.2-inch guns.  HMS M29 and her sisters were ordered from Harland & Wolff, Belfast in March 1915.  Launched on 22 May 1915, she was completed in June 1915.

Upon completion, M29 was sent to the Mediterranean, and took part in the Battle of Jaffa and remained there until December 1918.  She served from May to September 1919 in support of British and White Russian forces in the White Sea, before returning to England.

In September 1923, M29 was taken in hand for conversion to a minelayer.  Equipped to carry 52 mines, she was renamed HMS Medusa in December 1925.

In May 1941, she was converted to a repair ship and became the depot ship for the 10th Submarine Flotilla, being renamed HMS Talbot. Again renamed HMS Medway II in February 1944, she became the depot ship for the 1st Submarine Flotilla.  She was finally sold in December 1946 for breaking up at Dover.

Resold circa 1950 to Spyros Theodoratos, Greece and registered on January 21, 1951 at Lavrion (Nr. 7) as Gerogeogakis. Rebuilt at Perama as cargo motorship. Sold in 1956 to Elpida & Panagiotis Leivadas. On 16 November 1971 Gerogeogakis was intercepted off Cavallo Island, Corse, with a cargo of 12 tons of smuggled cigarettes. Seized and auctioned in 1974 for breaking up at Vado Ligure.

References 
 Young, John. A Dictionary of Ships of the Royal Navy of the Second World War. Patrick Stephens Ltd, Cambridge, 1975. 
 Lenton, H.T. & Colledge, J. J. Warships of World War II, Ian Allan, London, 1973. 
 Dittmar, F. J. & Colledge, J. J., "British Warships 1914-1919", (Ian Allan, London, 1972), 
 Gray, Randal (ed), "Conway's All the World's Fighting Ships 1906–1921", (Conway Maritime Press, London, 1985), 
 Bilalis, Aris, Monitors in the Aegean (Greek), Periplous Nautikis Istoria, Issue No. 113, Oct-Dec.2020, Maritime Museum of Greece.

 

M29-class monitors
Ships built in Belfast
1915 ships
World War I monitors of the United Kingdom
Royal Navy ship names
Ships built by Harland and Wolff